Reylander is a surname of Austrian origin and sometimes used as von Reylander as part of the Austrian nobility, normally used the title Baron until the nobility was officially abolished in 1919 after the fall of Austria-Hungary.

German-language surnames
Austrian noble families